The County Executive of Hudson County, New Jersey, United States is the chief officer of the county's executive branch who oversees the administration of county government and works in collaboration with the nine-member Board of County Commissioners (formerly Board of Chosen Freeholders), which acts in a legislative role. The New Jersey Superior Court had subsumed and replaced county courts in 1983. The office of the county executive is in the Hudson County Courthouse in the county seat, Jersey City.

The county executive is elected directly by the voters to a term of four years, which begins on January 1. At the 2010 United States Census, the county's population was 634,266. As of Election Day 2017 there were 348,366 registered voters in Hudson.

There have been three elected and one appointed county executives since the establishment of the office in 1977, which replaced the county supervisor. The incumbent, Thomas A. DeGise, took office in 2002 and has been re-elected for five consecutive terms; he was again re-elected in 2019. He intends to retire at the end of his term in 2023.  His chief of staff, Guy Graig, announced his candidacy for the position in September 2022.

History
Prior the creation of the office of executive, the Board of Chosen Freeholders chose a Director from among themselves.

In 1972, the State of New Jersey passed the Optional County Charter Law, which provides for four different manners in which a county could be governed: by an executive, an administrator, a board president or a county supervisor.

Hudson is one of five New Jersey counties with a popularly-elected county executive, the others being Atlantic, Bergen, Essex, and Mercer.

There have been three elected and one appointed county executives since the establishment of the office in 1977, which replaced the county supervisor.

County executives

1975–1987
Edward F. Clark Jr. (born Bayonne - d. December 3, 2011 Monmouth Beach) was elected after the form of county government was changed, becoming the county's first county executive in 1977.

Clark is the son Edward F. Clark Sr., who was once Mayor of Bayonne. He was graduate of George Washington University, Clark served in the Navy during World War II.
 
Clark served as Hudson County Freeholder from 1962 to 1970. He was director of the board from 1970 to 1972 and county supervisor from 1972 to 1975. After 12 years in the post, he was defeated in a Democratic primary for the office in 1987.

1988–2001
Robert C. Janiszewski (b. September 18, 1945 in Jersey City) was elected County Executive in 1987 after having won the Democratic primary against incumbent Edward F. Clark Jr.

He attended St. Joseph's School in Jersey City and St. Michael's High School in Union City. He graduated Jersey City State College with a B.A. degree in 1967 and an M.A. degree in sociology in 1975. He taught social sciences at Westwood High School and Hudson County Community College.

In 1977, Janiszewski was elected to the New Jersey General Assembly, serving from 1978 to 1984. He also served as a commissioner of the Port Authority of New York and New Jersey and chairman of the North Jersey Transportation Planning Authority. He entered the race for the Democratic gubernatorial primary in 1997 but withdrew before the election.

On September 6, 2001, Janiszewski resigned from his position as county executive due to corruption charges. He would later be sentenced to 41 months in prison for tax evasion and accepting more than $100,000 in bribes.

2001–2002 (interim)
Bernard M. Hartnett Jr., is a lawyer and former executive at New Jersey Bell. He was the former Hudson County Democratic chairman when appointed by county Democratic leaders as interim county executive on October 14, 2001, after the resignation of Janiszewski.

Hartnett was a pro-reform candidate. He had been considered for as an interim Mayor of Jersey City after the seat became vacant February 7, 1992, when Gerald McCann was removed from office after his conviction on fraud charges.

2002–present
Thomas DeGise was born, raised, and lives in Jersey City. He earned his bachelor's degree in Political Science from Saint Peter's College in 1973. He worked as teacher and administrator in the Jersey City Public Schools from 1975, and served as a job placement counselor at Henry Snyder High School before retiring.

DeGise entered public life as a community leader during the 1980s, founding the New #28 School Neighborhood Association and eventually chairing the Heights Coalition of Neighborhood Associations (HCNA) in the Heights section of Jersey City.

DeGise was Jersey City's longest serving Municipal Council President, holding that office from 1993 to 2001. In 2001, DeGise ran for Mayor of Jersey City in an election won by Glenn Cunningham.

Following the resignation of Janiszewski in September 2001, DeGise took office as county executive after winning a special election in November 2002 with 77 percent of the vote. On his first day in office, he submitted legislation to the Board of Chosen Freeholders to create the first ever Ethics Oversight Board for the Hudson County government. He was re-elected in 2003, 2007 and 2011 2015. DeGise served as the Chairman of the North Jersey Transportation Planning Authority for a two-year term that ended in January 2016.

He sought re-election in 2019 and won with 83% of the vote. for a term which ends December 31, 2023. He intends to retire.

See also
Atlantic County Executive
Bergen County Executive
Essex County Executive
Mercer County Executive
Borough president

References

External links 
Tom DeGise
County Executive of Hudson County

FindLaw's Superior Court of New Jersey, Appellate Division case and opinions.

 
County government in New Jersey